Euxoa crassilinea is a moth of the family Noctuidae first described by Hans Daniel Johan Wallengren in 1860. It is found in South Africa.

External links

Endemic moths of South Africa
Euxoa
Fauna of Lesotho
Moths described in 1860